The following units and commanders fought in the Battle of Lanfeng in May 1938.

China
 
1st War Area - Cheng Qian
Eastern Honan Army - Xue Yue   
64th Corps  - Li Han-huen    
155th Division - Chen Kung-hsin
187th Division - Peng Ling-cheng
8th Corps - Huang Chieh  
40th Division - Lo Li-jung
102nd Division - Po Hui-chang 
74th Corps - Wang Yaowu
51st Division - Wang Yao-wu
58th Division - Feng Sheng-fa
71st Corps   Song Xilian    
87th Division [2]
88th Division [2]

Reinforcements [May22nd]
 17th Army - Hu Zongnan - May22nd
 1st Corps - Li Tieh-chun 
 1st Division - Li Tieh-chun 
 78th Division - Li Wen
 27th Corps - Kuei Yung-ching  
 36th Division [2] - Chiang Fu-sheng
 46th Division - Li Liang-yung
 200th Division (1st Column) - Qiu Qingquan
 Tank battalion *
 Infantry battalion
 Engineer battalion
 Armored car battalion
 Antiaircraft unit
 Motor maintenance unit
 Antitank battalion

Note: 
 * Tanks of the 1st Column's armoured battalion would have been equipped with new Soviet T-26 tanks. (There is some photographic evidence that there were some of the Italian CV-33 tanks there as well. One was photographed on the Lanfeng battlefield with three Japanese troops examining it. see photo and discussion http://www.china-defense.com/forum/index.php?showtopic=512 )

Japan

North China Area Army - Juichi Terauchi [1,3]

1st Army - Kyoji Kotsuki
14th Division - Kenji Doihara
27th Infantry Brigade
2nd Infantry Regiment
59th Infantry Regiment
28th Infantry Brigade
15th Infantry Regiment
50th Infantry Regiment
20th Field Artillery Regiment
18th Cavalry Regiment
14th Engineer Regiment
14th Transport Regiment
	

Note: IJA 1st Army had these armoured units directly under its command that could have been assigned to 14th Division: [3]
1st Independent Light Armored Car Squadron
5th Independent Light Armored Car Squadron
2nd Tank Battalion

Sources 

[1] Hsu Long-hsuen and Chang Ming-kai, History of The Sino-Japanese War (1937-1945) 2nd Ed., 1971. Translated by Wen Ha-hsiung, Chung Wu Publishing; 33, 140th Lane, Tung-hwa Street, Taipei, Taiwan Republic of China.

page 230-235

Map. 9-2

[2] German trained Division.  Note these divisions had been badly mauled in the battles of Shanghai and of Nanking in 1937 and were no longer the crack units they once were. 

[3] 抗日战争时期的侵华日军序列沿革 (Order of battle of the Japanese army that invaded China during the Sino Japanese War)

[4] 國軍精銳---國民革命軍第二○○師  Elite Troops of the National Revolutionary Army, the 200th Division, (in Chinese)
  Translation

Second Sino-Japanese War orders of battle
Battles of the Second Sino-Japanese War